"Droppin' Like Flies" is a 1991 song by Sheila E., and the second single released from her album, Sex Cymbal. The song is a mid-tempo house number with Latin and R&B influences.

"Droppin' Like Flies" was a top 25 Dance hit, peaking at #23 on the U.S. Dance charts. It debuted and peaked at #77 on the R&B charts.

Music video
The elaborate music video featured Sheila E. and many people in a crime-ridden urban area, and featured police firing their guns, thugs fighting, and people walking out of shady clubs.

Chart positions

Formats and track listings
U.S. cassette maxi single
 "Droppin' Like Flies" (Black Flag Club Mix) – 7:08
 "Droppin' Like Flies" (Venus Fly Dub) – 5:12
 "Droppin' Like Flies" (Combat Bonus Beats) – 3:37
 "Droppin' Like Flies" (Mental Club Mix) – 5:52)
 "Droppin' Like Flies" (instrumental mix) – 6:48

U.S. 12" promo
 "Droppin' Like Flies" (Mental Club Mix) – 5:52
 "Droppin' Like Flies" (The Black Flag Club Mix) – 7:05
 "Droppin' Like Flies" (album version) – 5:27

U.S. CD promo
 "Droppin' Like Flies" (radio edit) – 4:10
 "Droppin' Like Flies" (radio mix) – 3:38
 "Droppin' Like Flies" (The Black Flag Club Mix) – 7:05

1992 singles
Sheila E. songs
Songs written by Sheila E.
1991 songs
Warner Records singles